Nadiia Kichenok was the defending champion, but lost in the first round to Akgul Amanmuradova.

Vitalia Diatchenko won the title, defeating the third seed Çağla Büyükakçay in the final, 6–4, 3–6, 6–2.

Seeds

Main draw

Finals

Top half

Bottom half

References 
 Main draw

President's Cup - Women's Singles
2014 WS